William Raymond Brennan  (born January 15, 1963) is a former pitcher in Major League Baseball. Brennan spent his high school years in Nashville, Tennessee and played for Bellevue and Hillwood High Schools.

Brennan attended Mercer University and was signed as an undrafted free agent by the Los Angeles Dodgers on September 1, 1984. He played for the Vero Beach Dodgers (1985), San Antonio Dodgers (1986) and Albuquerque Dukes (1987–1988) before making his major league debut with the Dodgers on July 19, 1988, as a starting pitcher against the St. Louis Cardinals. He worked 4.2 innings, gave up 3 runs and took the loss. He appeared in four games for the Dodgers during their championship year of 1988, making two starts.

He was back with the Dukes for 1989 and then moved around, playing for the Tucson Toros (Houston Astros), Harrisburg Senators (Montreal Expos), Toledo Mud Hens (Detroit Tigers) and Iowa Cubs, before getting another chance in the bigs with the Chicago Cubs in 1993. He pitched in 8 games, making 1 start in '93.

After one more season with Iowa, he was out of baseball after the 1994 season.

External links

Major League Baseball pitchers
Los Angeles Dodgers players
Chicago Cubs players
Mercer Bears baseball players
1963 births
Living people
Vero Beach Dodgers players
San Antonio Dodgers players
Albuquerque Dukes players
Tucson Toros players
Harrisburg Senators players
Toledo Mud Hens players
Iowa Cubs players
Baseball players from Tampa, Florida